This is a list of holidays in South Sudan.

Holidays 
 January 1: New Year's Day
 Varies Yearly: Good Friday
 Varies Yearly: Holy Saturday
 Varies Yearly: Easter Sunday
 Varies Yearly: Easter Monday
 May 1: Labour Day
 May 16: SPLA Day
 July 9: Independence Day
 July 30: Martyrs' Day
 December 24: Christmas Eve
 December 25: Christmas Day
 December 26: Boxing Day
 Varies Yearly Eid al-Fitr
 Varies Yearly Eid al-Adha

References 

South Sudanese culture
South Sudan
South Sudan